Ahmad Askar (born 25 August 1961) is a Kuwaiti footballer. He competed in the men's tournament at the 1980 Summer Olympics.

References

External links
 

1961 births
Living people
Kuwaiti footballers
Kuwait international footballers
Olympic footballers of Kuwait
Footballers at the 1980 Summer Olympics
Place of birth missing (living people)
Association football midfielders
Al-Arabi SC (Kuwait) players
Kuwait Premier League players